Pleomorphomonas oryzae is a nitrogen-fixing bacterium species from the genus of Pleomorphomonas which has been isolated from the rice plant Oryza sativa in Japan.

References

Further reading

External links 
Type strain of Pleomorphomonas oryzae at BacDive -  the Bacterial Diversity Metadatabase

Hyphomicrobiales
Bacteria described in 2005